The Deep was a short-lived American psychedelic rock band made up of musicians from New York City, who in 1966 traveled to Philadelphia to record a one-time LP, Psychedelic Moods.  The band was experimentally progressive, as they were one of the earliest groups to record psychedelic music, before it was adapted by a wider array of musical acts.  Although their only album failed to achieve success, it later gained acclaim for being considered the earliest work to reference "psychedelic" in its title.

Information on the band is sparse as only one band member had a confirmed musical career prior to recording. The member, Rusty Evans (born Marcus Uzilevsky, 1937, New York City, died December 5, 2015, Woodacre, California), was the Deep's lead guitarist, primary songwriter, and a vocalist.  Evans initially recorded in 1958 as a rockabilly singer, before performing as a Greenwich Village folk musician in the late 1950s and early 1960s.  He recorded three albums as Rusty Evans – Songs of Our Land, Railroad Songs (both 1964) and Live at Gerde's Folk City (1965) – and was later a member of the folk group The New Christy Minstrels. Musician David Bromberg is also known to have played on The Deep's one and only album, although it is unknown on which tracks he played.

In the early summer of 1966, Evans convinced producer Mark Barkan to help him record a psychedelic album.  They secured arrangements with the Philadelphia-based Cameo-Parkway label, the home for fellow protopunk act Question Mark and the Mysterians, for a meager budget of $1200.  In August, Evans and Barkan assembled a group of New York musicians to record as the Deep, and they drove in a rundown car to Philadelphia to record what would become the Psychedelic Moods album, which was done in the short period of four days and would necessitate late-night sessions in order to be finished on time.  The all-night sessions also provided the musicians, who were unable to afford a hotel, with a place to sleep.

While the exact release date of the album has yet to be definitively established, the record is generally considered to have been distributed in October 1966, based on the album's catalogue number. This would credit it as the first official album to include the word "psychedelic" in its title, pre-dating the Blues Magoos' debut, Psychedelic Lollipop, and The 13th Floor Elevators' debut album, The Psychedelic Sounds of the 13th Floor Elevators. The Deep's Psychedelic Moods did not sell well, and the group did not tour to support it. They existed as a studio-only band, and, aside from sessions for their album, produced no other recordings under that name.

Evans left Cameo-Parkway to record a new album for the Columbia Records label in 1967. Abandoning the "Deep" name, this second album was credited to the band The Freak Scene and entitled Psychedelic Psoul. Despite the name change, the band still contained the original lineup from the first album, and the sound of this album is very similar to that of Psychedelic Moods. It is typically considered a follow-up in all but name. As its title suggests, Psychedelic Psoul is composed of psychedelic-influenced tracks as the band continued to develop past concepts from their debut album. However, The Freak Scene's album met the same results as Psychedelic Moods. They did not tour, and their album did not chart. The album has been rereleased by Sony BMG through Columbia Records on vinyl. The group disbanded in late 1967.

After this venture, Evans returned to performing as a solo musician. He recorded under his birthname, Marcus, for a self-titled album in 1969, which produced compositions conceived as psychedelic folk in nature. He did not record another album until 1979, when he released Life's Railway Heaven, another folk effort. Evans recorded sporadically until his death, usually in the style of folk or rockabilly music,  and in the 1990s released two new age CDs, Slice of Light and Gypsy Dreams, credited as Uzca.  He also led a Johnny Cash tribute band.  Under his real name of Marcus Uzilevsky, he was a respected visual artist best known for his landscape paintings, and was exhibited widely in California.

References

Garage rock groups from New York (state)
Musical groups established in 1966
Musical groups disestablished in 1966
Musical groups from Philadelphia
Psychedelic rock music groups from New York (state)